The Brushy Canyon Formation is a Permian geologic unit in Guadalupe Mountains National Park. The formation contains fan sandstones that were deposited under ancient seawater during the Middle Permian. These rocks contain abundant fish fossils like sharks' teeth preserved within small phosphatic nodules.

Footnotes

References
 Hunt, ReBecca K., Vincent L. Santucci and Jason Kenworthy. 2006. "A preliminary inventory of fossil fish from National Park Service units." in S.G. Lucas, J.A. Spielmann, P.M. Hester, J.P. Kenworthy, and V.L. Santucci (ed.s), Fossils from Federal Lands. New Mexico Museum of Natural History and Science Bulletin 34, pp. 63–69.

Permian geology of Texas
Guadalupe Mountains National Park